The Silver Goddesses is a film award granted annually by the Mexican Film Journalists Association (PECIME) in recognition of professionals and excellence in the Mexican film industry as assessed by the association's voting membership. The first award ceremony was held in 1963; making Tlayucan (1962) the first winner of the Silver Goddesses for Best Film and in eight different categories.

References

External links
Mexican Cinema Journalists - IMDb
Periodistas Cinematográficos de México - Official Website 
Cancelan la edición 2019 de Las Diosas de Plata 
La Diosa de Plata, un galardón con historia 
 
Awards established in 1971
Mexican film awards
Film editing awards